İstanbul'un Kızları is a 1964 Turkish crime drama film, directed by Halit Refiğ and starring Cüneyt Arkın, Nilüfer Aydan, and Handan Adali.

Cast 
 Cüneyt Arkın
 Nilüfer Aydan
 Sevda Ferdağ
 Haldan Adali
 Önder Somer
 Selma Güneri
 Hayati Hamzaoğlu
 Meral Sayın
 Suphi Tekniker
 Gürel Ünlüsoy
 Memduh Ün

References

External links 
İstanbul'un Kızları at the Internet Movie Database

1964 films
Turkish crime drama films
1964 crime drama films
Films directed by Halit Refiğ
Turkish black-and-white films